The 2004–05 Georgia Tech Yellow Jackets men's basketball team represented Georgia Institute of Technology as a member of the Atlantic Coast Conference during the 2004–05 season. Led by fifth-year head coach Paul Hewitt, the Yellow Jackets had high expectations entering the season with numerous returning players from the previous season's NCAA Tournament runner-up team. They were ranked in the top 5 of preseason AP and Coaches' Polls, receiving first-place votes in both. The team struggled to a .500 record in ACC play, but looked strong in the ACC Tournament, and received an at-large bid to the NCAA tournament. Playing as No. 5 seed in the Midwest region, Georgia Tech beat George Washington before falling to No. 4 seed and eventual Final Four participant Louisville in the round of 32 to finish 20–12 overall (8–8 ACC).

Roster

Schedule and results

|-
!colspan=9 style=| Regular Season

|-
!colspan=9 style=| ACC Tournament

|-
!colspan=9 style=| NCAA Tournament

Sources

Rankings

Players in the 2005 NBA draft

References

Georgia Tech Yellow Jackets men's basketball seasons
Georgia Tech
Georgia Tech Yellow Jackets men's basketball team
Georgia Tech Yellow Jackets men's basketball team
Georgia Tech